Cogswell Dam is a rockfill dam on the West Fork of the San Gabriel River in Los Angeles County, California. It is located in the San Gabriel Mountains, northeast of Mount Wilson, and within the Angeles National Forest.

The dam serves mainly for flood control in conjunction with San Gabriel Dam and Morris Dam downstream.

Construction
Bonds for the dam's construction were issued in 1924. Construction began in March 1932 and was completed in April 1934, at a total cost of US$3,127,762.

The dam rests on crystalline granite bedrock. There are concrete cutoff walls and a concrete facing slab on the dam's upstream side.

See also
 List of dams and reservoirs in California

References

Los Angeles County Department of Public Works dams
Rock-filled dams
San Gabriel River (California)
San Gabriel Mountains
Angeles National Forest
Dams completed in 1935
1935 establishments in California